Wilkes-Barre Area Wolfpack refers to Wilkes-Barre Area School District teams that are available to students from Wilkes-Barre Area High School, and formerly James M. Coughlin High School, G. A. R. Memorial Junior/Senior High School, and Elmer L. Meyers Junior/Senior High School. The Wolfpack mascot was chosen by votes of students and employees of the school district. They played their first games in 2019.

Description 
Prior to the opening of, Wilkes-Barre Area High School, the Wilkes-Barre Area Wolfpack referred to Wilkes-Barre Area School District teams that were available to students from James M. Coughlin High School, G. A. R. Memorial Junior/Senior High School, and Elmer L. Meyers Junior/Senior High School. With the opening of Wilkes-Barre Area High School, students that school now comprise the Wolfpack.

History 
In 2010s, the Wilkes-Barre school district entertained various plans to reduce its schools by consolidation, leading to construction of a new high school to server the entire district. The new high school plans include a construction of stadium. Due to declining participation in sports, the district merged the sports programs for the 2019 school year, prior to the construction of the new high school. The Wolfpack's first football game took place in August 2019. The basketball team won their PIAA District 2 championship in 2020.

Mascot 
Based on input from students and employees, the district voted for Wolfpack to be mascot of the consolidated sports programs. Logos and uniforms were designed in early 2019.

See also 
 Wilkes-Barre Area High School
 Wilkes-Barre Area School District

References 

High school sports in Pennsylvania
Sports in the Scranton–Wilkes-Barre metropolitan area
2019 establishments in Pennsylvania